Anatoly Vladimirovich Olizarenko (25 September 1936 – 30 January 1984) was a Soviet cyclist. He competed in the individual road race and the team time trial at the 1964 Summer Olympics and finished in 56th and 5th place, respectively. 

Olizarenko won the Tour d'Egypte in 1958. In 1960 he placed third in the Tour of Poland and ninth in the Peace Race. In 1963, he was again ninth in the Peace Race, but won a bronze medal at the world championships in the team time trial. In 1966 he rode his last Peace Race, winning it with the Soviet team, but finishing only 54th individually. He retired after the race.

References

1936 births
1984 deaths
Soviet male cyclists
Olympic cyclists of the Soviet Union
Cyclists at the 1964 Summer Olympics
Russian male cyclists
Cyclists from Saint Petersburg